Douglas A. Yates is an American political scientist residing in Paris. He specializes in African politics and the politics of the oil industry in Africa and is known for his development of rentier state theory. He has authored or co-authored several books on the subject.

Biography

Yates was born in Hollywood, California, in 1964. He earned his PhD in political science from Boston University in 1994 and moved to Paris in 1996. He has since written on neo-colonialism and the oil industry in Africa. He has authored or co-authored five books on the subject, including The Scramble for African Oil and The Rentier State in Africa.

Yates has collaborated with the Africa Regional Services of the United States Department of State as a speaker in its democracy promotion programs, travelling various African countries on training missions for government electoral workers, press corps, and judicial officers. Yates is also a regular contributor on CNBC, France 24 and Al Jazeera.

Douglas Yates currently serves as a Professor of Anglo-American Law at the Cergy-Pontoise University and as a Professor of international relations and African politics at the American Graduate School in Paris.

Bibliography

References

American political scientists
Boston University College of Arts and Sciences alumni